Isocitrate lyase family is a family of evolutionarily related proteins.

Isocitrate lyase is an enzyme that catalyzes the conversion of isocitrate to succinate and glyoxylate. This is the first step in the glyoxylate bypass, an alternative to the tricarboxylic acid cycle in bacteria, fungi and plants. A cysteine, a histidine and a glutamate or aspartate have been found to be important for the enzyme's catalytic activity. Only one cysteine residue is conserved between the sequences of the fungal, plant and bacterial enzymes; it is located in the middle of a conserved hexapeptide.

Other enzymes also belong to this family including carboxyvinyl-carboxyphosphonate phosphorylmutase which catalyses the conversion of 1-carboxyvinyl carboxyphosphonate to 3-(hydrohydroxyphosphoryl) pyruvate carbon dioxide, and phosphoenolpyruvate mutase, which is involved in the biosynthesis of phosphinothricin tripeptide antibiotics.

Subfamilies
Isocitrate lyase 
Methylisocitrate lyase 
Carboxyvinyl-carboxyphosphonate phosphorylmutase

References

Protein domains
Protein families